Opunohu Bay is a 3-km long bay on the island of Moorea, Tahiti. The water is 80 metres deep at the mouth. The bay is subject to wind-driven currents and upwellings. Sailboats and tour boats regularly enter the bay. Opunohu bay is west of Cook's Bay and Pao Pao.

Geography
It is located about 20 miles west of Papeete, the capital of French Polynesia. Opunohu bay is in western Moorea where Mt. Rotui towers over the bay. Mt. Tohivea is Moorea's highest mountain just to the south. Papetoai is located to the west of the bay. People from the east of the bay would drive through the bay and reach Papetoai. Piheana is located to the east of the bay.

Tourism
People mainly come into the bay to get to Papetoai. They mainly come to Papetoai to shop at the shopping center. Pao Pao is not too far away from the bay. Some people stop at a small road that goes all the way to Mount Tohivea with views of the 2 bays of Moorea. International flights land at the Faa'a International Airport. The tourist would take either ferry or airplane to reach Moorea. Air Tahiti would land in the Moorea Airport. Then the tourist would drive westbound toward Opunohu bay.

References

External links
Flickr images

Bays of French Polynesia
Bodies of water of Tahiti
Mo'orea